Pop and Contemporary Fine Art is a contemporary art gallery located at Orchard Road, Central Region, Singapore. Residing on the third floor of Palais Renaissance,  the gallery specializes in original paintings, limited edition lithographs, screen prints, etchings, and sculptures from the Pop and Contemporary Art genres.

Philosophy
Pop and Contemporary Fine Art's goal is to show contemporary work that would otherwise not be seen in Singapore. "The gallery's guiding principle is to treat people in the same way we would like to be treated. Art is about learning and discovering your likes and dislikes, it is highly personal and intimate and should be in no way a scary journey. The gallery's aim is also to allow art from blue chip artists to become more accessible to the Singapore and South East Asian region", asserts the gallery's managing director, Saskia Joosse.

Artists
Artists shown at the gallery include: 
 Andy Warhol
 Burton Morris
 Keith Haring
 Roy Lichtenstein
 Yayoi Kusama
 Takashi Murakami
 Jim Dine
 Robert Indiana
 Damien Hirst

Gallery exhibitions
The following exhibitions have been held at the gallery:

 2009: Art Soiree
 2010: Yayoi Kusama
 2010: Warhol's 15 Minutes in Singapore
 2011: Pop! Back into the Future – works by Burton Morris

External shows
The following exhibitions have been held offsite:

 2010 Burton Morris, W Hotels in Sentosa.
 2010 Yayoi Kusama, "Land of the Rising Sun", St. Regis Singapore.
 2010 ARTSingapore Fair in Singapore.
 2011 Yayoi Kusama, "The Dots Within" at ION Orchard, ION ART Gallery, Singapore.
 2011 The Affordable Art Fair, Fair in Singapore.

Publications
Pop and Contemporary Fine Art Gallery and its owner, Saskia Joosse have regularly contributed to several publications which include Home and Decor, The Billionaire, Confabulation and The Pocket Arts Guide. 
In 2011, The Pocket Arts Guide, invited Saskia to be their guest editor for the February edition where she created a special feature on Pop art.

References

External links
 Pop and Contemporary Fine Art website
 Pop and Contemporary Fine Art on Facebook

2008 establishments in Singapore
Contemporary art galleries in Asia
Art museums and galleries in Singapore
Orchard, Singapore
Art galleries established in 2008